Night of the Ninja is a straight-to-video motion picture released in 1989 by Imperial Entertainment Corp.

The film is essentially two or three martial arts films edited together to appear as one, although this is unconfirmed. The majority of the film's running time depicts a man attempting to escape his criminal past only to be drawn into an organized crime war over a stolen diamond. A substantial subplot deals with a Caucasian insurance investigator in Hong Kong hired to apparently track down the same diamond. Another plotline concerns a family of ninja attempting to break in to an old thief's house.

1989 films
Hong Kong martial arts films
1980s crime films